Bharat Pandya is an Indian politician. He was elected to the Gujarat Legislative Assembly from Dhandhuka in the 2002 Gujarat Legislative Assembly election as a member of the Bharatiya Janata Party. He defeated then Chief Minister of Gujarat Dilip Parikh.

References

1967 births
Living people
Bharatiya Janata Party politicians from Gujarat
People from Ahmedabad
Gujarat MLAs 1998–2002
Gujarat MLAs 2002–2007